Terrell Lewis (born August 25, 1998 as Terrell Hall) is an American football defensive end for the Chicago Bears of the National Football League (NFL). He played college football at Alabama.

Early life and high school
Born Terrell Hall, Lewis grew up in Washington, D.C. and attended St. John's College High School. As a senior, Lewis recorded 42 tackles, 21 tackles for a loss, and nine sacks he was named the Football Player of the Year for Washington, D.C. by USA Today and Gatorade. He was also invited to play in the 2016 Under Armour All-America Game. Rated a five star recruit by Rivals.com and four stars by ESPN, Scout and 247Sports, as well as a top-ten weak side defensive end by all four, Lewis initially committed to play college football at Ohio State during his junior year. He de-committed from Ohio State in the summer going into his senior year, ultimately committing to play at Alabama after considering offers from Maryland, Florida State and Mississippi.

College career
As a freshman Lewis played in 11 games for the Crimson Tide, making 11 tackles with one sack. He tore a ligament in the first game of his sophomore season against Florida State, causing him to miss the next ten games. He returned for the final game of the regular season against Auburn and played in the postseason, making his first career start in the 2018 College Football Playoff National Championship. He finished the season with 16 total tackles and a sack. Lewis tore his ACL in summer training camp going into his junior season and was forced to use a medical redshirt.

Lewis entered his redshirt junior season as a starting outside linebacker for Alabama and was named to the Butkus Award watchlist. He finished the season with 31 tackles, 11.5 tackles for loss, 6.0 sacks, 16 quarterback hurries, two pass breakups and one fumble recovery and was named second team All-SEC. Lewis opted not to play in the Citrus Bowl and decided to enter the 2020 NFL Draft, forgoing his final year of NCAA eligibility. Lewis finished his collegiate career with 58 tackles (14.5 for loss), eight sacks, three passes defended and a forced fumble in 26 games played.

Professional career

Los Angeles Rams
Lewis was selected by the Los Angeles Rams in the third round with the 84th overall pick in the 2020 NFL Draft. He was placed on the reserve/COVID-19 list by the team on July 31, 2020. He was activated on August 14, 2020. He was placed on the reserve/non-football injury (NFI) list on September 9, 2020. He was designated to return from the NFI list on October 1, and began practicing with the team again. He was activated on October 10 and made his NFL debut on October 11, 2020 in a 30-10 win over the Washington Football Team.

In Week 10 against the Seattle Seahawks, Lewis recorded his first two career sacks on Russell Wilson during the 23–16 win.

Lewis won Super Bowl LVI when the Rams defeated the Cincinnati Bengals.

On December 15, 2022, Lewis was waived by the Los Angeles Rams.

Chicago Bears
On December 20, 2022, Lewis was signed to the Chicago Bears practice squad. On January 4, 2023, the Bears signed him to the active roster.

Personal life
Lewis changed his last name from Hall to Lewis going into his sophomore year.

References

External links
Los Angeles Rams bio
Alabama Crimson Tide bio

1998 births
Living people
Players of American football from Washington, D.C.
American football linebackers
Alabama Crimson Tide football players
Under Armour All-American football players
Los Angeles Rams players
Chicago Bears players